Golestan-e Shahid Rejai (also Romanized as Golestān-e Shahīd Rejā’ī) is a village in Rigestan Rural District, Zavareh District, Ardestan County, Isfahan Province, Iran. At the 2006 census, its population was 101, in 30 families.

References 

Populated places in Ardestan County